Robert Arnott may refer to:

Robert Arnott (academic) (born 1951), British archaeologist
Robert D. Arnott (born 1954), American entrepreneur
Bob Arnott (born William Robert Arnott, 1922–2016), Australian skier

See also
Robert Arnott Wilson (born 1958), British mathematician